Denzil Foster and Thomas McElroy are an American R&B record production and songwriting duo, releasing recordings under the names Foster & McElroy and Fmob. They have written and produced songs for musicians such as Club Nouveau, Tony! Toni! Toné!, Alexander O'Neal, Regina Belle, and Swing Out Sister. Their music has been sampled in hit songs by the Luniz, Puff Daddy, Ashanti, Jay-Z, Jennifer Lopez, LL Cool J, Jessica Simpson, and others. Foster & McElroy are best known as the founders of the group En Vogue, listed by  Billboard as one of the Top 10 Girl Groups of All Time. In addition to producing music for various television shows, they are also credited for songs in numerous movie soundtracks including The Great White Hype, Lean on Me, and Who's That Girl.

Biography
Denzil Foster was born in Oakland, CA and was greatly influenced by different styles of music, from The Beatles to Parliament/Funkadelic.  Thomas McElroy, also born in Oakland, was influenced by his father's love for jazz music. The two musicians first met in California while attending college and decided to work together as colleagues.

Career

Signing to the independent Triangle label, they released one 12" single. Soon after, Foster & McElroy joined forces with Jay King producing Timex Social Club's hit single "Rumors" in 1986. When that group disbanded, they regrouped with King to form Club Nouveau. Eventually, the duo left Club Nouveau after their first album Life, Love & Pain to focus on production and songwriting. In 1988, they landed a production deal with Wing Records, eventually signing the band Tony! Toni! Toné!, as well as brother and sister act Channel 2.

Foster & McElroy are considered pioneers of new jack swing, a genre they helped define with the group Tony! Toni! Tone!. The duo produced the group's first album and had success with the first single release, "Little Walter," which peaked at #47 on the Billboard Hot 100. In 1990, the group released The Revival, its second album which went 2x's Platinum and had numerous #1 singles. Following the success of Tony! Toni! Toné!, Foster & McElroy released their first album as a group, FM2, one of which included songs such as "Around the World in 80 Beats", "Gotta Be a Better Way", and "Dr. Soul", the latter of which was a top ten R&B hit featuring rapper MC Lyte.  It earned moderate success.  While working on the album, Foster & McElroy made plans to put together a girl group that would be a modern-day version of The Supremes, with what eventually became the group En Vogue.

After several audition calls, Foster & McElroy eventually selected Cindy Herron, Maxine Jones, and Dawn Robinson to become the members of the newly titled "For You." The group became a quartet after the addition of Terry Ellis and the name was changed to "Vogue." After learning that another group already had that moniker, Foster & McElroy changed the name to "En Vogue." The group's first album, Born to Sing, was released in 1990 and sold over one million copies with numerous singles reaching #1 on Billboard charts. En Vogue's second album, Funky Divas, was released in 1992 and became the highest selling album to date and one of the top selling albums of that year with over five million copies sold worldwide. With hits such as "Hold On", "Lies", "Free Your Mind", "My Lovin' (You're Never Gonna Get It)", and "Don't Let Go (Love)", En Vogue has become one of the most successful girl groups in music history. It was also listed as one of the Top 10 Girl Groups of All Time by Billboard.

They recorded a second album in 1994, a hip-hop jazz album Once in a Blue Moon, under their new name FMob. The duo has also written theme songs for television programs, including Hangin' with Mr. Cooper, Roc (both themes, used during the former’s first season and the latter’s final two seasons, were performed by En Vogue), and BET's Video Soul. They have also been credited with numerous movie soundtracks.

Discography

Singles

Albums

Movie soundtracks

References

Songwriters from California
Record producers from California
American contemporary R&B musical groups
Record production duos
American songwriting teams